Saint Omer is a 2022 French legal drama film directed by Alice Diop and starring Kayije Kagame and Guslagie Malanda. It is Diop's first narrative feature after working as a documentary filmmaker. In the film, Rama (Kagame) is a pregnant young novelist who attends the trial of Laurence Coly (Malanda), a Senegalese woman accused of murdering her 15-month-old child by leaving her on a beach to be swept away by the tide, in order to turn the tragic event into a literary retelling of Medea. It is based on the French court case of Fabienne Kabou, who was convicted of the same crime. Diop attended Kabou's trial in 2016.

The film premiered in-competition at the 79th Venice International Film Festival on 7 September 2022, where it won the Silver Lion Grand Jury prize along with the Luigi De Laurentiis Lion of the Future award. Additional screenings were held at the 2022 Toronto International Film Festival and the 2022 New York Film Festival before the theatrical release in France on 23 November 2022. The film was selected as the French entry for the Best International Feature Film at the 95th Academy Awards, and made the December shortlist.

Plot
Rama, a literature professor and novelist, travels from Paris to Saint-Omer to observe the trial of Laurence Coly and write about the case. Coly is a student and Senegalese immigrant accused of leaving her 15-month-old daughter on a beach to be swept away by the tide in Berck. Rama, who is four-months pregnant and, like Coly, is in a mixed-race relationship and has a complex relationship with her own Senegalese immigrant mother, feels a personal connection to Coly. She plans to write a modern day retelling of the Greek Medea myth about the case. As she learns more about Coly's life and the isolation Coly experienced from her family and society while living in France, Rama becomes increasingly anxious about her own life and pregnancy.

Cast
 Kayije Kagame as Rama
 Guslagie Malanda as Laurence Coly
 Valérie Dréville as The Judge
 Aurélia Petit as Defence Barrister Vaudenay
 Xavier Maly as Luc Dumontet, Coly's partner
 Robert Canterella as Barrister
 Salimata Kamate as Odile Diata
 Thomas de Pourquery as Adrian, Rama's partner
 Salih Sigirci as Salih
 Fatih Sahin as Fatih
 Atillahan Karagedik as Jackson
 Ege Güner as Ege Güner
 Mustili as Mustafa
 Lionel Top as Journalist

Production
Saint Omer is based on the 2016 court case of Fabienne Kabou, who was convicted of killing her daughter in 2013, in the same way as Coly. Diop followed the case and immediately recognized Kabou's features from news footage as being Senegalese, which is Diop's family heritage. Diop attended the trial and became "obsessed" with the case, noting that most of the attendees and participants at the trial were also women. Diop elaborated that she "wanted to find answers to my own intimate questions that I had asked myself about my relationship with my own mother and being a mother myself. And I decided that since I shared those same emotions with so many women, if we were all so obsessed with that event, it meant there was something universal in the story, which had to do with motherhood. So I decided to make a film about it." Like Rama, Diop was pregnant with her first child while attending the trial. Diop said that she attended the trial out of "intuition" and did not decide to make a film about it until after the trial ended. Having only made documentary films, Diop made her narrative feature film debut because cameras were not allowed in the courtroom and she "wanted to recreate my experience of listening to another woman's story while interrogating myself, facing my own difficult truths."

Court-transcripts were partially used to write the screenplay. While writing the script, Diop first met actresses Kayije Kagame and Guslagie Malanda. She was immediately impressed with both women and thought of them while still writing the script. She later contacted both Kagame and Malanda to audition. Diop was influenced by the work of Marguerite Duras, whom the character Rama gives a lecture about in the film. Filming took six weeks and both the cast and crew were mostly female, which "wasn't fully deliberate, nor was it wholly accidental" according to Diop. Filming took place between May and July 2021 in the Île-de-France and Hauts-de-France regions, including in the commune of Saint-Omer.

Release
Saint Omer was initially considered for the 2022 Cannes Film Festival. It premiered at the 79th Venice International Film Festival on 7 September 2022, where it won the Grand Jury Prize along with the Luigi De Laurentiis Lion of the Future award.

Critical reception
On Rotten Tomatoes, the film holds an approval rating of 94% based on 116 reviews, with an average rating of 8.2/10. The website's consensus reads, "A gut-punching contemplation of a woman's immigrant experience, Saint Omer puts a mother on the stand and the audience in the jury box to find humanity in the inhumane." According to Metacritic, which assigned a weighted average score of 91 out of 100 based on 34 critics, the film received "universal acclaim". 

Manohla Dargis of The New York Times called it "Intellectually galvanizing and emotionally harrowing, the story explores motherhood, race and postcolonial France with control, lucidity and compassion."

In September 2022 it was selected as France's official selection for Best International Film at the 95th Academy Awards.

Accolades

See also
 List of submissions to the 95th Academy Awards for Best International Feature Film
 List of French submissions for the Academy Award for Best International Feature Film

References

External links
 

 Saint Omer 2022 Toronto International Film Festival page
 Saint Omer 79th Venice International Film Festival page
 Saint Omer – Wild Bunch Inbternational page
 Les films du losange page
 SRAB Films page

2022 films
2020s French-language films
2022 drama films
French drama films
French films based on actual events
Venice Grand Jury Prize winners
2020s French films
French courtroom films
2020s legal drama films
Films shot in Île-de-France
Films shot in Hauts-de-France
Films set in Hauts-de-France
Best First Feature Film César Award winners